The 2009 LSU Tigers football team represented Louisiana State University in the 2009 NCAA Division I FBS football season. The team's head coach was Les Miles who served his fifth year at the helm of LSU football. They played their home games at Tiger Stadium in Baton Rouge, Louisiana. The Tigers finished the season 9–4, 5–3 in SEC play, including a loss in the Capital One Bowl, 19–17, against Penn State.

Previous season
In his fourth season as head coach, Les Miles led LSU to a regular season record of 7–5, finishing 3–5 in the SEC.  The Tigers were awarded a berth in the 2008 Chick-fil-A Bowl where they faced Georgia Tech.  The Tigers easily defeated the Yellow Jackets by a score of 38–3.  Miles improved to 4–0 in bowl games as head coach of LSU.  LSU completed the 2008 college football season with an 8–5 overall record.  The bowl victory also marked the 700th win in LSU Tiger football history.  The Tigers look to improve on their 8–5 season in 2009.

Before the season

Coaching changes
Following the 2008 season, co-defensive coordinators, Doug Mallory & Bradley Dale Peveto both left LSU.  Mallory moved on to New Mexico to become defensive coordinator of the Lobos' football program, while Peveto took over as the head coach of the Northwestern State Demons.  The Tigers replaced Mallory and Peveto with new defensive coordinator John Chavis, who left the University of Tennessee after the departure of head coach Phillip Fulmer.  Chavis was a Tennessee alum and held the position of defensive coordinator there since 1995.  Chavis will also coach linebackers at LSU.

Ron Cooper was hired as the new defensive backs coach.  Previously, Mallory had coached the defensive backs since 2005.  Cooper came to LSU from the University of South Carolina where he spent the past five years coaching on the defensive side of the football.

Earl Lane also left LSU following the 2008.  Lane spent 3 seasons as defensive line coach at LSU, but decided it was time to move on.  Lane was replaced by Brick Haley.  Haley was brought aboard as a veteran defensive line coach who has spent time in both the NFL and the Southeastern Conference.

Finally, Josh Henson, who left to become co-offensive line coach for Missouri, was replaced by Don Yanowsky.  Henson came to LSU with Miles in 2005 and served as the Tight Ends coach and recruiting coordinator for the Tigers.  Henson has a reputation as of being one of the best recruiters in the nation.  Yanowsky will also serve as the Tight Ends coach and Recruiting coordinator, and comes to LSU from Boston College.

Key losses
Offense
Demetrius Byrd, WR Drafted in the 7th round of the 2009 NFL Draft by the San Diego Chargers.
Brett Helms, C Signed with the Houston Texans as a rookie free agent.
Quinn Johnson, FB Drafted in the 5th round of the 2009 NFL Draft by the Green Bay Packers.
Herman Johnson, OG Drafted in the 5th round of the 2009 NFL Draft by the Arizona Cardinals.

Defense
Darry Beckwith, LB Signed with the San Diego Chargers as a rookie free agent.
Marlon Favorite, DT Signed with the Carolina Panthers as a rookie free agent.
Tyson Jackson, DL Drafted 3rd overall in the 2009 NFL Draft by the Kansas City Chiefs.
Ricky Jean-Francois, DT Drafted in the 7th round of the 2009 NFL Draft by the San Francisco 49ers.
Kirston Pittman, DE Signed with the St. Louis Rams as a rookie free agent, but later released with an injury settlement
Curtis Taylor, S Drafted in the 7th round of the 2009 NFL Draft by the Green Bay Packers.

Special teams
Colt David, PK All-time scoring leader for the LSU Tigers.

Returning starters

Offense

Defense

2009 recruiting class

Spring game
The Tigers held their annual spring game on Saturday April 18, 2009.  LSU White defeated LSU Purple 27–0.

Pre-season All-SEC honors
Rahim Alem, third-team DL
Charles Alexander, second-team DL
Ciron Black, first-team OL
Richard Dickson, first-team TE
Trindon Holiday, third-team RS
Chad Jones, second-team DB
Brandon Lafell, second-team WR
Perry Riley, third-team LB
Charles Scott, first-team RB
Terrance Toliver, third-team WR

Pre-season watch lists
Rahim alem – 2009 Ted Hendricks Award and Bednarik Award Watch Lists
Ciron black – 2009 Outland Trophy Watch List
Richard dickson – 2009 John Mackey Award Watch List
Jordan Jefferson – 2009 Davey O'Brien National Quarterback Award Watch List
Brandon lafell – 2009 Biletnikoff Award and Maxwell Award Watch Lists
Charles scott – 2009 Doak Walker Award and Maxwell Award Watch Lists

Schedule

Game summaries

Washington
Pregame Line: -18.5

Vanderbilt
Pregame Line: -14

Louisiana-Lafayette
Pregame Line: -27
 LSU improved to 22–0 all-time against the Ragin Cajuns.

Mississippi St.
Pregame Line: -12.5
LSU has now beaten Mississippi State 10 straight times.

#14 Georgia
Pregame Line: +3.5
LSU beats Georgia in Athens for the first time since 1987.

#1 Florida
Pregame Line: +10
Largest crowd ever in Tiger Stadium

Auburn
Pregame Line: -7.5
LSU beats Auburn for the third straight year.
Marks the start of the longest active home winning streak in college football.

Tulane
Pregame Line: -36.5
LSU beats the Green Wave for the 18th straight time.

#3 Alabama
Pregame Line: +7
The win marks the first time the Crimson Tide have beaten the Tigers in Tuscaloosa since 1999.

Louisiana Tech
Pregame Line: -23
With the win, LSU improved to 18–1 all-time against Louisiana Tech.

Ole Miss
Pregame Line: +4.5
LSU has lost to a Houston Nutt coached team 3 straight times (Arkansas 2007, Ole Miss 2008 & 2009).

Arkansas
Pregame Line: -4
LSU defeats the Razorbacks for the first time since 2006. The only bright spot for Arkansas is that they were the only team to outscore LSU in the third quarter this year.

Penn State–Capital One Bowl

Rankings

Roster

2009 Louisiana State University Football Roster and Bios http://www.lsusports.net/SportSelect.dbml?&DB_OEM_ID=5200&SPID=2164&SPSID=27812

Coaching staff

2009 Louisiana State University Football Coaches and Bios http://www.lsusports.net/SportSelect.dbml?&DB_OEM_ID=5200&SPID=2164&SPSID=28715

LSU Tigers in the 2010 National Football League Draft 

https://www.pro-football-reference.com/draft/2010.htm

References

LSU
LSU Tigers football seasons
LSU Tigers football